The 1983 Ridgewood Open was a women's tennis tournament played on indoor carpet courts in Ridgewood, New Jersey in the United States that was part of the Ginny Circuit of the 1983 Virginia Slims World Championship Series. The tournament was held from February 21 through February 28, 1983. Third-seeded Alycia Moulton won the singles title.

Finals

Singles

 Alycia Moulton defeated  Catrin Jexell 6–4, 6–2
 It was Moulton's 1st title of the year and the 2nd of her career.

Doubles

 Beverly Mould /  Elizabeth Sayers defeated  Rosalyn Fairbank /  Susan Leo 7–6, 4–6, 7–5
 It was Mould's only title of the year and the 2nd of her career. It was Sayers' 1st title of the year and the 1st of her career.

Notes

References

External links
 The Ginny Circuit (PDF)

 
Ridgewood Open
Ridgewood Open
Ridgewood Open
Ridgewood Open
Ridgewood Open